Three prime repair exonuclease 2 is an enzyme that in humans is encoded by the TREX2 gene.

This gene encodes a protein with 3' exonuclease activity. Enzymes with this activity are involved in DNA replication, repair, and recombination. Similarity to an E. coli protein suggests that this enzyme may be a subunit of DNA polymerase III, which does not have intrinsic exonuclease activity.

Mutations in this gene may lead to Aicardi-Goutieres syndrome

References

Further reading

External links